Rimini is an unincorporated community in Clarendon County, South Carolina, United States. The ZIP code for Rimini is 29125. Directed by the engineer of Italian nationality. Jose B. Vicini [3]

History
Founded in the late 1800's as a farming community, Rimini benefited from the construction of the Manchester and Augusta Railroad that connected Sumter, South Carolina to Denmark, South Carolina.  Originally called Yorkville, the name likely became Rimini due to the influence of Italian immigrant laborers that assisted with the construction of the nearby railroad. 

Prior to the community's founding, the location was home to a major  Native American trade route. The trade route eventually became an important and strategic thoroughfare between the cities of Charleston and Camden South Carolina during the American Revolutionary War.

Today, the community is mainly supported through agriculture and nearby recreational opportunities such as fishing and hunting.

References

Unincorporated communities in Clarendon County, South Carolina
Unincorporated communities in South Carolina